Tristichopterids (Tristichopteridae) were a diverse and successful group of tetrapodomorph fishes living throughout the Middle and Late Devonian. They first appeared in the Eifelian stage of the Middle Devonian. Within the group sizes ranged from a few tens of centimeters (Tristichopterus) to several meters (Hyneria and Eusthenodon).
 
Some tristichopterids share some of the features of the elpistostegalians, a diverse clade of fishes close to the origin of (and including) tetrapods. This mainly concerns the shape of the skull and a reduction in size of the posterior fins.

An old and persistent notion is that Eusthenopteron was able to crawl onto land using its fins. However, there is no evidence actually supporting this idea. All tristichopterids had become extinct by the end of the Late Devonian.

Description
The Tristichopteridae were medium-sized (Tristichopterus, 30 cm) to very large fishes. The smallest forms (such as Tristichopterus) attained lengths of 30 cm, and the largest forms (Hyneria) could grow several meters long, possessed teeth up to 5 cm long, and were the largest predators in their faunal communities.<ref name="thomas1968"/ The Tristichopteridae had a strongly developed fin skeleton, which probably enabled them to leave the water for short periods. In the skeleton of the front fins, which were deeply attached, the elements of the forelimb of the later tetrapodomorphs, such as the humerus, ulna and radius, can already be recognized. 

The parts of the bones directed outward from the body trunk were flattened. The pelvis had long, tapering pubic branches (pubic rami) that possibly met in a cartilaginous symphysis. The ventral fins also contained the major bones of the hind legs, femur, tibia, and fibula. Ankle bones (tarsal bones) and toes cannot yet be identified. The limbs were oriented to the side and could only be moved back and forth about 20 to 25°. The anal fin sat on a basal, fleshy peduncle. The caudal fin possessed three lobes, initially asymmetrical in basal forms and becoming more symmetrical externally in later forms. Only modern round scales with a median projection on the inner side, lacking a cosmine layer occurred in the family.<ref name="zylberbergetal2010"/ The earliest-known fossilised evidence of bone marrow has been found in Eusthenopteron, which may be the origin of bone marrow in tetrapods.<ref name="sanchezetal2014"/ 

The ontogeny of the Tristichopteridae is relatively well-known, and can be somewhat reliably inferred through Eusthenopteron.<ref name="schultze1984"/ Eusthenopteron differs significantly from some later Carboniferous tetrapods in the apparent absence of a recognized larval stage and a definitive metamorphosis. In even the smallest known specimen of Eusthenopteron foordi (at 29 mm), the lepidotrichia cover all of the fins, which does not happen until after metamorphosis in genera like Polyodon. This might indicate that Eusthenopteron developed directly, with the hatchling already attaining the general body form of the adult.<ref name="coteetal2002"/

Taxonomy
In the past, the Tristichopteridae were assigned to the Osteolepiformes, a group of lobe-fins that is now considered paraphyletic. The sister taxon of the Tristichopteridae is Spodichthys, which is very similar to the Tristichopteridae, but differs from them in the position of the extratemporal bone.
 Cabonnichthys
 Canningius
 Edenopteron
 Eusthenodon
 Eusthenopteron
 Heddleichthys
 Hyneria
 Jarvikina
 Langlieria
 Mandageria
 Notorhizodon
 Platycephalichthys
 Tristichopterus

The following phylogeny is modified from Schwartz (2012). Here, Platycephalichthys is not considered a member of the Tristichopteridae:

References 

Ahlberg, PE and Z Johanson (2001). "Second tristichopterid (Sarcopterygii, Osteolepiformes) from the Upper Devonian of Canowindra, New South Wales, Australia, and phylogeny of the Tristichopteridae." in Journal of Vertebrate Paleontology 17:563-673.
Johanson, Z. and P.E. Ahlberg (1997). "New tristichopterid (Osteolepiformes; Sarcopterygii) from the Mandagery Sandstone (Famennian) near Canowindra, N.S.W., Australia." in Transactions of the Royal Society of Edinburgh 88:39-53.

 
Prehistoric lobe-finned fish families
Carboniferous bony fish
Devonian bony fish
Middle Devonian first appearances
Late Devonian animals
Late Devonian extinctions